Smack Bunny Baby is the debut album from the band Brainiac, released in 1993 via Grass Records. Along with its successor Bonsai Superstar, Smack Bunny Baby is currently out-of-print and the copyright is now owned by The Bicycle Music Company. It is the only album by the group to feature founding guitarist Michelle Bodine.

The LP edition of the album includes the track "Velveteen" that's not found of the CD edition. Also, an unknown amount of LP copies were pressed on turquoise-marbled vinyl.

Critical reception
Spin included the album on its 1993 "10 Best Albums of the Year You Didn't Hear" list, calling it "a noisy little devil that benefits greatly from a fondness for Moog synth and a good ear for (buried) melody."

Track listing

Personnel
Tim Taylor (credited as timmytaylor) - vocals, guitars, Moog synthesizer
Michelle Bodine - guitars
Jaun Monasterio (credited as Monostereo) - bass
Tyler Trent - drums
Eli Janney - production, engineering, recording
Ray Martin - engineering, mixing assistance
Bruce Hathaway - engineering, recording assistance

References

1993 debut albums
Brainiac (band) albums